The following is a list of current and former Major League Baseball spring training ballparks.

Current ballparks

Grapefruit League (Florida)

Cactus League (Arizona)

Formerly used ballparks

See also
List of MLB stadiums
List of MLB spring training cities

Notes

References

External links

 02
Spring training ballparks
ballparks
Spring
Major League Spring training ballparks